The 3rd Lithuanian National Cavalry Brigade was a military unit of the Grand Duchy of Lithuania led by Józef Antoni Kossakowski.

History

Origins 
The brigade was formed in 1792.

Organisation 
The brigade was organised into banners, per which there were two squadrons.

Commanders 
The commanders of the unit were:

 Brigadier-Commandant — Józef Antoni Kossakowski
 Vicebrigadier-vicecommandant — Józef Białłozor
 Major — Marcin Białłozor
 Aide-de-camp — Stanisław Eysymont
 Quartermaster-lieutenant — Stanisław Hromyko
 Judge advocat — Adamowicz

1792-1794 
The regiment was stationed in Raseiniai. As of April 1794, there were 332 men in the brigade, although it was supposed to be 419. At the time, it was organised into four banners.

Kościuszko Uprising 
The unit partook in the Vilnius Uprising on 11 August 1794.

References 

Military units and formations established in 1792
Lithuanian National Cavalry Brigades